Liaquat  may refer to:

Liaquat Ali Khan, Former Prime Minister of Pakistan
Liaquat National Memorial Library, located in Karachi, Pakistan
Ra'ana Liaquat Ali Khan, Pakistani politician
Liaquat–Nehru Pact, accord between India and Pakistan
Liaquat University of Medical and Health Sciences, located in Jamshoro, Sindh, Pakistan
Liaqat National Bagh, at Jamshoro, Sindh, Pakistan
Liaquat Ahamed, Pulitzer Prize-winning author
Aamir Liaquat, Pakistani politician
Liaquat National Hospital, located in Karachi, Pakistan.
Maulvi Liaquat Ali, Indian religious leader
Liaquat University Hospital, Hyderabad, located in Pakistan
Liaquat Soldier, Pakistani actor
Liaquat Ali (athlete), Pakistani athlete

See also
Liaqat
Liaqat Ali (disambiguation)

Arabic masculine given names
Pakistani masculine given names